The Words of My Father is a 2001 Italian drama film directed by Francesca Comencini. It was screened in the Un Certain Regard section at the 2001 Cannes Film Festival.

Cast
 Fabrizio Rongione - Zeno Cosini
 Chiara Mastroianni - Ada
 Mimmo Calopresti - Giovanni Malfenti
 Claudia Coli - Alberta
 Viola Graziosi - Augusta
 Toni Bertorelli - Zeno's father
 Camille Dugay Comencini - Anna

References

External links

2001 films
2001 drama films
Italian drama films
2000s Italian-language films
Films directed by Francesca Comencini
Films scored by Ludovico Einaudi
2000s Italian films